The Southern Miss Golden Eagles football team competes as part of the NCAA Division I Football Bowl Subdivision (FBS), representing the University of Southern Mississippi as a member of Conference USA (C-USA). Since the establishment of the team in 1912, Southern Miss has appeared in 26 bowl games. In their latest bowl appearance, Southern Miss was defeated by Tulane in the 2020 Armed Forces Bowl. The win brings the Golden Eagles' overall bowl record to 11 wins and 15 losses.

Bowl games

Notes

References

Southern Miss

Southern Miss Golden Eagles bowl games